The women's 10,000 metres event featured at the 2001 World Championships in Edmonton, Alberta, Canada. There were a total number of 24 participating athletes, with the final being held on 7 August 2001.

Medalists

Final

See also
 2000 Olympics Women's 10,000 metres

References
 Official results from IAAF

Events at the 2001 World Championships in Athletics
10,000 metres at the World Athletics Championships
2001 in women's athletics